The Halladay Motor Car company was founded in 1905 in Streator, Illinois, and moved to Ohio in 1917.

Origins 
The company originated with the Erie Motor Carriage & Manufacturing Company in Anderson, Indiana, which was bought out in 1902 by Lou P. Halladay. He spent a year earning $30,000 in capital, then renamed the company the Streator Automobile & and Manufacturing Company. The company kept this name until 1913.

Streator Automobile & and Manufacturing Company  

The first car came out in 1904 with great secrecy. It was a five-passenger touring car with a four-cylinder engine. The engines came from the Rutenber Motor Company. In 1908, the company added a runabout and a limousine.  About 900 cars were made every year. The cars were well-built. In 1910, a Halladay was the only car to finish a 250-mile race in Atlanta. On September 23, 1911, the company fell into receivership, with $250,000 in liabilities. In January 1913, the company's property was sold to the Merchants' Realization Company, which then sold it to Albert C. Barley, the secretary of the Rutenber Motor Company.

Models

Under Albert Barley 

While under Albert Barley, he named the company Barley Motor Car Company, but still produced the Halladay. After a while, he lost interest in the Halladay, so in 1916 he sold the Halladay to a group of investors headed by T. E. Huth, while he made a new car called the Roamer.

In Ohio 

In 1917, the group of investors kept making the Halladay, now in Warren, Ohio. They changed the name to Halladay Motor Car Company. They still used a six-cylinder engine provided by Rutenber. The cars were advertised as "sturdy, compact, and low-upkeep". In 1920, the company was moved to Newark, Ohio, where the name was changed to Halladay Motors Corporation. In 1922, the company tried to make a 4-cylinder car called the Falcon, but in March, the company went into receivership again. This was because of charges from the Barber Asphalt Paving Company of Pennsylvania, which had not been paid for work done around the Newark plant. This time, Halladay went out of business.

References 

Motor vehicle manufacturers based in Illinois
Motor vehicle manufacturers based in Ohio
Defunct motor vehicle manufacturers of the United States
Halladay automobile
Halladay automobile
Cars introduced in 1905
1900s cars
1910s cars
Vehicle manufacturing companies established in 1905
Manufacturing companies disestablished in 1922
Brass Era vehicles
Vintage vehicles
1905 establishments in Illinois